Wally James Williams, Jr. (born February 20, 1971 in Tallahassee, Florida)

Professional career

During his tenure as a professional footballer with the Cleveland Browns, Baltimore Ravens, and New Orleans Saints, Williams was able to excel as an undrafted free agent.

He was the first franchised player in Baltimore Ravens history.

In 2015 was inducted to Florida A&M University Hall of Fame and was also elected to the Baltimore Ravens All-Time Team in 2020.

References

1971 births
Living people
American football offensive guards
Baltimore Ravens players
Cleveland Browns players
Florida A&M Rattlers football players
New Orleans Saints players
Players of American football from Tallahassee, Florida
Ed Block Courage Award recipients